The Environmental Audio Extensions (or EAX) are a number of digital signal processing presets for audio, present in Creative Technology Sound Blaster sound cards starting with the Sound Blaster Live and the Creative NOMAD/Creative ZEN product lines. Due to the release of Windows Vista in 2007, which deprecated the DirectSound3D API that EAX was based on, Creative discouraged EAX implementation in favour of its OpenAL-based EFX equivalent – though at that point relatively few games used the API.

Technology

EAX is a library of extensions to Microsoft's DirectSound3D, itself an extension to DirectSound introduced with DirectX 3 in 1996 with the intention to standardize 3D audio for Microsoft Windows, adding environmental audio presets to DS3D's audio positioning. Ergo, the aim of EAX has nothing to do with 3D audio positioning, this is usually done by a sound library like DirectSound3D or OpenAL. Rather, EAX can be seen as a library of sound effects written and compiled to be executed on a DSP instead of the CPU, often called "hardware-accelerated".

The aim of EAX was to create more ambiance within video games by more accurately simulating a real-world audio environment. Up to EAX 2.0, the technology was based around the effects engine aboard the E-mu 10K1 on Creative Technology's and the Maestro2 on ESS1968 chipset driven sound cards. The hardware accelerated effects engine is an E-mu FX8010 DSP integrated into the Creative Technology's audio chip and was historically used to enhance MIDI output by adding effects (such as reverb and chorus) to the sampled instruments on 'wavetable' sample-based synthesis cards (which is often confused with the "wavetable synthesis" developed by Wolfgang Palm of PPG and Michael Mcnabb in the late-1970s, however not related). A similar effects DSP was also present on Creative's cards back to the AWE 32. However, the EMU10K1's DSP was faster and more flexible and was able to produce not only MIDI output but also other outputs, including the digital sound section.

Developers taking advantage of EAX choose an environment for their game's setting and the sound card uses the mathematical DSP digital filter presets for that environment. The original EAX was quite primitive, only offering 26 presets and 3 parameters for more accurate adjustment of the listener parameters and 1 parameter for the sources. Each revision of the technology increased the available effects. EAX Advanced HD (also known as EAX 3) and up provide support for new environmental transitions, new effects, and multiple active effects. Further additions include smooth changes between EAX environment presets and audio occlusion effects (simulating a wall between player and sound source).

EAX was used in many popular titles of the time, including Half-Life, Unreal Tournament, Splinter Cell, Rogue Spear, Doom 3, F.E.A.R., Counter-Strike, and Prey. These games support EAX 4.0 if audio hardware with an OpenAL-supporting driver is present. Because hardware acceleration for DirectSound and DirectSound3D was dropped in Windows Vista, OpenAL runtime software is required to enable EAX in many games, it still functions in Windows 10, although OpenAL was also discontinued by Creative. OpenAL Soft, an open source version of OpenAL, is still actively maintained, and can be used by game developers, and to enable EAX sound in older games. 

Most releases of EAX versions coincided with increases in the number of simultaneous voices processable in hardware by the audio processor: the original EAX 1.0 supports 8 voices, while EAX 5.0 allows 128 voices (and up to 4 effects applied to each). Creative cards are generally backwards compatible with older EAX versions, although hardware accelerated DSP processing of these effects only happens on cards with EMU chips. Most audio solutions from Creative released after the X-Fi Titanium HD (except for the Audigy Rx) and other companies offer EAX software emulation of varying degrees instead.

EAX 1.0
8 simultaneous voices processable in hardware
32 individual 3D voices
Environmental Effect Presets
Per-channel individual environmental presets
Hardware DSP rendering
Specification released in 1998

EAX 2.0
EAX 2.0 is supported by Sound Blaster Live! sound cards
32 simultaneous voices processable in hardware
Occlusion Effects
Material-specific reverb parameters
Specification released in 1999

EAX 3.0
EAX 3.0 is supported by E-mu 10K-based products such as the Sound Blaster Audigy
64 simultaneous voices processable in hardware
'Smoothing' between 3D audio environments
Direct access to all reverb parameters
Environmental Panning
New reverb engine
Beginning of the AdvancedHD Designation from new reverb engine

EAX 4.0
EAX 4.0 is supported by Audigy series sound cards.
Real-time hardware effects
Multiple simultaneous environments
Flanger
Echo
Distortion
Ring modulation effects
Specification released in 2003

EAX 5.0
EAX 5.0 is supported by E-mu 20K-based products such as the Sound Blaster X-Fi (except the Xtreme Audio cards).
128 simultaneous voices processable in hardware and up to 4 effects on each
EAX Voice (processing of microphone input signal)
EAX PurePath (EAX Sound effects can originate from one speaker only)
Environment FlexiFX (four available effects slots per channel)
EAX MacroFX (realistic positional effects at close range)
Environment Occlusion (sound from adjacent environments can pass through walls)
Specification released in 2005

Future development
In Creative's OpenAL 1.1 specification, an alternative software system for 3D sound which Creative made, EAX should be considered deprecated as a developer interface. New development should use OpenAL's EFX interface, which emulates all previous EAX functionality and is more tightly coupled with the overall OpenAL framework.

Creative stopped updating OpenAL also, although an open source version, OpenAL Soft is still actively maintained.

EAX emulation

When Windows Vista discontinued DirectSound3D, Creative made a software package called OpenAL which allows many Windows EAX-carrying games to play software and hardware (soundcard driven) mode EAX with varying success. OpenAL builds on the EAX extensions with EFX extensions. OpenAL still installs and functions on Windows 10, although is no longer actively maintained and released. An open source version called OpenAL Soft is available which is actively maintained, although it has less support for all versions of EAX.

Realtek released the "Realtek 3D Soundback Beta 0.1" software package to allow Realtek cards to play EAX and DirectSound3D on Windows Vista and newer operating systems. It may work with your Realtek soundcard in Windows 10. It requires Windows Vista compatibility mode to install.

nForce soundcards feature native support for EAX. The games that use EAX with nForce may need files changed to run properly.

Rapture3D supports EAX, it is a commercial wrapper for OpenAL used in games such as Dirt 3.

Wine implements software emulation of a subset of EAX.

In addition to physical soundcard devices, Creative released EAX emulation software (Creative ALchemy) for a range of computers and motherboards that had Creative-made onboard audio. Creative ALchemy will not function unless it detects a Creative Labs device.

Sound Blaster Audigy ADVANCED MB
 The Sound Blaster Audigy ADVANCED MB includes Creative Audio Center, Creative MediaSource 5 Player/Organizer, Creative WaveStudio 7, Creative ALchemy; 
Also known as Sound Blaster Audigy ADVANCED MB, it is similar to Audigy 2 SE, but the software supports EAX 3.0, which supports 64-channel software wavetable (sample-based synthesis) with DirectSound acceleration, but without hardware accelerated 'wavetable' sample-based synthesis. DAC is rated 95 dB Signal-to-Noise Ratio.

It is available as an integrated option for Dell Inspiron, Studio and XPS notebooks.

Later versions of the driver support EAX 5.0.

Sound Blaster X-Fi MB
 The Sound Blaster X-Fi MB includes Entertainment Console, Creative Karaoke Player, Creative MediaSource 5 Player/Organizer, Creative WaveStudio 7, Creative Audio Console, Creative ALchemy.

It features:

 EAX 5.0 and OpenAL support
 Crystallizer
 CMSS-3D
 SVM
 Graphic Equalizer
 Creative ALchemy (Windows Vista and Windows 7 only, is used for providing EAX in Vista)
 Console Launcher (Entertainment Mode)
 Audio Console
 Karaoke Player
 Creative WaveStudio
 Creative MediaSource

Unlike its predecessor, Audigy Advanced MB, X-Fi MB does not include a software-based SoundFont synthesizer. Another difference is that it has the option to run in 30-day trial mode.

Audio player versions
EAX-like technology is also present in several digital audio players by Creative Technologies, such as the NOMAD and ZEN lines. In these devices, the following effects and features are implemented:
Different reverb-like environments
Speed-shifting (slower or faster)
Environment adaptation (train, plane, public place etc.)
Sound image (broad, narrow etc.)
A simple graphical equalizer

See also
 Convolution reverb
 OpenAL
 DirectSound
 A3D
 Dolby Surround / Dolby Pro Logic / Dolby Digital
 AMD TrueAudio
 Head-related transfer function (HRTF)

References

External links
Creative ALchemy FAQ
Creative ALchemy v1.45.19 Download from Creative Support Website
Official website
Developer site
I3DL2 and Creative EAX
Sound Blaster Audigy ADVANCED MB
Sound Blaster X-Fi MB
Games that use EAX

Creative Technology
Digital audio
Film and video technology
Virtual reality